Kashkhatau (Qaşxatau) is a rural locality (a settlement)  and the administrative center of Chereksky District of the Kabardino-Balkar Republic, Russia. Population:

References

Notes

Sources

Rural localities in Kabardino-Balkaria